Caleb Tasker, (Tasker) is an Australian music producer, DJ, songwriter and vocalist based in Sydney. He has written and produced for a number of Australian artists including Tuka, Okenyo, Tia Gostelow and Maribelle. He also plays in the band "Pleasure Coma" and "Rest For The Wicked".

Discography

Production/ Co-Writes/ Vocals/ Remixes

Studio albums

References 

Australian record producers
Living people
1996 births